The 2015 East Carolina Pirates baseball team represents East Carolina University during the 2015 NCAA Division I baseball season. The Pirates play their home games at Clark–LeClair Stadium as a member of the American Athletic Conference. They are led by head coach Cliff Godwin, in his first season at East Carolina.

Previous season
In 2014, the Pirates finished the season 7th in Conference USA with a record of 33–26, 16–14 in conference play. They qualified for the 2014 Conference USA baseball tournament, losing in the second round, but failed to qualify for the 2014 NCAA Division I baseball tournament.

Personnel

Roster

Coaching staff

Season

February
The Pirates opened their season on February 13 against Virginia, as part of a home-and-home series. The Pirates traveled to Charlottesville, Virginia, in 2014, and were swept in a three-game series. Once again, the Cavaliers swept the Pirates, this time over the first weekend of the 2015 season. The Pirates struggled offensively, and scored just five runs over the entire series. Josh Sborz collected two saves for Virginia. The following Wednesday, the Pirates were scheduled to visit Old Dominion, but bad weather caused a postponement until April. The following week, the Pirates' home game against the Monarchs on the 25th was also pushed until March 4.

On the second weekend of the season, weather related issues caused a shakeup to the schedule of the annual Keith LeClair Classic hosted by ECU. East Carolina went 1–2 on the weekend, defeating St. John's and UNC Greensboro, but falling to Liberty, to win the classic for the third consecutive year.

The Pirates closed the month of February (and opened the month of March in the finale) with a three-game series against . Originally, ECU was scheduled to play in the annual Irish Classic in Cary, North Carolina, but it was cancelled due to weather. The Pirates swept the Great Danes over the three game series, outscoring them by a cumulative score of 24–7.

March
In the Pirates' first midweek game of March, they traveled to rival NC State and lost by a score of 0–7, extending their losing streak against the Wolfpack in Raleigh to five games. The following day, the Pirates returned home and hosted Old Dominion in the makeup game of a February 25 postponement. In their 9–7 win, East Carolina broke a 5–5 deadlock with two runs in both the seventh and eight innings, and despite allowing a run in both the eight and ninth innings, held on for their sixth victory of the season.

In their first weekend series in March, the Pirates hosted . After the game scheduled for Friday, March 6 was pushed back to Saturday, March 7, as part of a doubleheader, ECU swept the doubleheader against the Hawks, shutting out Monmouth in both games. In the first game of the doubleheader, a 2–0 victory, Evan Kruczynski threw a complete game, two hit shutout. In the second game of the doubleheader, the Pirates scored six runs in the first inning to coast to a 9–0 win. ECU completed the sweep with a 3–2 win on Sunday.

In the second week of March, the Pirates opened with a pair of midweek games. They lost the first game to  4–9, before rebounding to defeat UNC Greensboro, 8–1. It was the Pirates' second win over UNC Greensboro on the season, after having defeated them on February 21. For the second straight weekend, the Pirates picked up a three-game sweep, after sweeping Monmouth the previous weekend. East Carolina scored 41 runs in the series.

The Pirates hosted , out of the Ivy League, for a two-game midweek series from March 17–18. The Pirates swept the Tigers over the two game series to improve their record on the season to 15–6 and extended their winning streak to six games. Following the midweek series against the Tigers, ECU hosted VCU, a traditional midweek opponent, for a three-game weekend series. The Pirates dropped both the first and last games of the series, dropping their first weekend series since opening weekend against Virginia.

Schedule

! style="background:#4B1869;color:white;"| Regular Season
|- valign="top" 

|- bgcolor="#ffbbbb"
| February 13 || No. 3 Virginia ||  || Clark–LeClair Stadium • Greenville, NC || L 1–3 || Kirby (1–0) || Kruczynski (0–1) || Sborz (1) || 2,541 || 0–1 || –
|- bgcolor="#ffbbbb"
| February 14 || No. 3 Virginia ||  || Clark–LeClair Stadium • Greenville, NC || L 2–9 || Jones (1–0) || Wolfe (0–1) ||  || 3,058 || 0–2 || –
|- bgcolor="#ffbbbb"
| February 14 || No. 3 Virginia ||  || Clark–LeClair Stadium • Greenville, NC || L 2–4 || Roberts (1–0) || Boyd (0–1) || Sborz (2) || 3,058 || 0–3 || –
|- bgcolor="#bbbbbb"
| February 18 || at Old Dominion ||  || Bud Metheny Baseball Complex • Norfolk, VA || colspan=7| Postponed Rescheduled for April 15
|- bgcolor="#bbffbb"
| February 21 ||  ||  || Clark–LeClair Stadium • Greenville, NC || W 8–3 || Kruczynski (1–1) || Clark (1–1) ||  || 2,207 || 1–3 || –
|- bgcolor="#ffbbbb"
| February 22 ||  ||  || Clark–LeClair Stadium • Greenville, NC || L 3–4 || Clowers (2–0) || Love (0–1) ||  || 2,207 || 1–4 || –
|- bgcolor="#bbffbb"
| February 22 ||  ||  || Clark–LeClair Stadium • Greenville, NC || W 9–2 || Lucroy (1–0) || Magee (0–2) ||  || 2,142 || 2–4 || –
|- bgcolor="#bbbbbb"
| February 25 || Old Dominion ||  || Clark–LeClair Stadium • Greenville, NC || colspan=7| Postponed Rescheduled for March 4
|- bgcolor="#bbffbb"
| February 27 ||  ||  || Clark–LeClair Stadium • Greenville, NC || W 5–1 || Kruczynski (2–1) || Ryan (1–1) || Love (1) || 482 || 3–4 || –
|- bgcolor="#bbffbb"
| February 28 || Albany ||  || Clark–LeClair Stadium • Greenville, NC || W 14–3 || Boyd (1–1) || Sorgie (0–2) ||  || 587 || 4–4 || –
|-

|- bgcolor="#bbffbb"
| March 1 || Albany ||  || Clark–LeClair Stadium • Greenville, NC || W 5–3 || Morgan (1–0) || Woods (0–2) || Love (2) || 422 || 5–4 || –
|- bgcolor="#ffbbbb"
| March 3 || at NC State ||  || Doak Field • Raleigh, NC || L 0–7 || Britt (1–0) || Boyd (1–2) ||  || 456 || 5–5 || –
|- bgcolor="#bbffbb"
| March 4 || Old Dominion ||  || Clark–LeClair Stadium • Greenville, NC || W 9–7 || Morgan (2–0) || Bainbridge (0–1) || Ingle (1) || 2,155 || 6–5 || –
|- bgcolor="#bbffbb"
| March 7 ||  ||  || Clark–LeClair Stadium • Greenville, NC || W 2–0 || Kruczynski (3–1) || McKenna (0–2) ||  || 2,263 || 7–5 || –
|- bgcolor="#bbffbb"
| March 7 || Monmouth ||  || Clark–LeClair Stadium • Greenville, NC || W 9–0 || Wolfe (1–1) || Trimarco (0–2) ||  || 2,263 || 8–5 || –
|- bgcolor="#bbffbb"
| March 8 || Monmouth ||  || Clark–LeClair Stadium • Greenville, NC || W 3–2 || Love (1–1) || Ciavarella (0–3) ||  || 2,226 || 9–5 || –
|- bgcolor="#ffbbbb"
| March 10 ||  ||  || Clark–LeClair Stadium • Greenville, NC || L 4–9 || Thompkins (3–0) || Boyd (1–3) ||  || 2,150 || 9–6 || –
|- bgcolor="#bbffbb"
| March 11 || UNC Greensboro ||  || Clark–LeClair Stadium • Greenville, NC || W 8–1 || Morgan (3–0) || Betts (0–1) ||  || 1,928 || 10–6 || –
|- bgcolor="#bbffbb"
| March 13 || at  ||  || Walter C. Latham Park • Elon, NC || W 10–3 || Kruczynski (4–1) || Harris (2–1) ||  || 161 || 11–6 || –
|- bgcolor="#bbffbb"
| March 14 || at Elon ||  || Walter C. Latham Park • Elon, NC || W 11–8 || Love (2–1) || McGillicuddy (0–1) ||  || 318 || 12–6 || –
|- bgcolor="#bbffbb"
| March 15 || at Elon ||  || Walter C. Latham Park • Elon, NC || W 20–4 || Lucroy (2–0) || Stalzer (1–3) ||  || 615 || 13–6 || –
|- bgcolor="#bbffbb"
| March 17 ||  ||  || Clark–LeClair Stadium • Greenville, NC || W 11–2 || Boyd (2–3) || Donatiello (0–1) ||  || 2,239 || 14–6 || –
|- bgcolor="#bbffbb"
| March 18 || Princeton ||  || Clark–LeClair Stadium • Greenville, NC || W 8–3 || Durazo (1–0) || Bodurian (0–1) || Love (3) || 2,015 || 15–6 || –
|- bgcolor="#ffbbbb"
| March 20 || VCU ||  || Clark–LeClair Stadium • Greenville, NC || L 3–4 || Lees (3–0) || Boyd (2–4) || Concepcion (3) || 2,069 || 15–7 || –
|- bgcolor="#bbffbb"
| March 21 || VCU ||  || Clark–LeClair Stadium • Greenville, NC || W 9–3 || Morgan (4–0) || Gill (0–2) ||  || 2,862 || 16–7 || –
|- bgcolor="#ffbbbb"
| March 22 || VCU ||  || Clark–LeClair Stadium • Greenville, NC || L 2–3 || Lees (4–0) || Boyd (2–5) || Concepcion (4) || 2,295 || 16–8 || –
|- bgcolor="#ffbbbb"
| March 24 || at  ||  || Brooks Field • Wilmington, NC || L 2–4 || Barnes (4–0) || Love (2–2) || Gesell (2) || 1,635 || 16–9 || –
|- bgcolor="#ffbbbb"
| March 25 ||  ||  || Clark–LeClair Stadium • Greenville, NC || L 2–13 || Hennessey (1–2) || Boyd (2–6) ||  || 2,290 || 16–10 || –
|- bgcolor="#bbffbb"
| March 28 || Memphis ||  || Clark–LeClair Stadium • Greenville, NC || W 4–1 || Kruczynski (5–1) || Wallingford (3–2) ||  || 2,315 || 17–10 || 1–0
|- bgcolor="#ffbbbb"
| March 28 || Memphis ||  || Clark–LeClair Stadium • Greenville, NC || L 2–3 || Myers (1–0) || Boyd (2–7) || Blackwood (8) || 2,315 || 17–11 || 1–1
|- bgcolor="#ffbbbb"
| March 29 || Memphis ||  || Clark–LeClair Stadium • Greenville, NC || L 2–4 || Myers (2–0) || Lucroy (2–1) || Blackwood (9) || 2,051 || 17–12 || 1–2
|-

|- bgcolor="#bbffbb"
| April 2 || Tulane ||  || Clark–LeClair Stadium • Greenville, NC || W 3–0 || Love (3–2) || Merrill (1–3) ||  || 2,213 || 18–12 || 2–2
|- bgcolor="#bbffbb"
| April 3 || Tulane ||  || Clark–LeClair Stadium • Greenville, NC || W 11–4 || Boyd (3–7) || Rankin (3–1) ||  || 2,411 || 19–12 || 3–2
|- bgcolor="#ffbbbb"
| April 4 || Tulane ||  || Clark–LeClair Stadium • Greenville, NC || L 6–8 || Massey (2–2) || Lucroy (2–2) || Duester (2) || 2,261 || 19–13 || 3–3
|- bgcolor="#bbffbb"
| April 7 || at Campbell ||  || Jim Perry Stadium • Buies Creek, NC || W 7–5 || Wolfe (2–1) || Long (3–1) || Love (4) || 828 || 20–13 || –
|- bgcolor="#ffbbbb"
| April 10 || at South Florida ||  || USF Baseball Stadium • Tampa, FL || L 1–2 || Herget (6–1) || Love (3–3) || Peterson (11) || 862 || 20–14 || 3–4
|- bgcolor="#ffbbbb"
| April 11 || at South Florida ||  || USF Baseball Stadium • Tampa, FL || L 0–10 || Mulholland (4–4) || Kruczynski (5–2) ||  || 868 || 20–15 || 3–5
|- bgcolor="#bbffbb"
| April 12 || at South Florida ||  || USF Baseball Stadium • Tampa, FL || W 6–0 || Durazo (2–0) || Cavallardo (3–1) || Boyd (1) || 517 || 21–15 || 4–5
|- bgcolor="#bbffbb"
| April 15 || at Old Dominion ||  || Bud Metheny Baseball Complex • Norfolk, VA || W 4–2 || Boyd (4–7) || Mathesson (2–6) || Durazo (1) || 445 || 22–15 || –
|- bgcolor="#bbffbb"
| April 17 || at Connecticut ||  || J. O. Christian Field • Storrs, CT || W 7–3 || Kruczynski (6–2) || Cross (7–2) || Durazo (2) || 71 || 23–15 || 5–5
|- bgcolor="#ffbbbb"
| April 18 || at Connecticut ||  || J. O. Christian Field • Storrs, CT || L 3–7 || Kay (6–3) || Lucroy (2–3) || Ruotolo (5) || 305 || 23–16 || 5–6
|- bgcolor="#bbffbb"
| April 19 || at Connecticut ||  || J. O. Christian Field • Storrs, CT || W 4–3 (10) || Voliva (1–0) || Darras (2–2) || Wolfe (1) || 287 || 24–16 || 6–6
|- bgcolor="#bbffbb"
| April 21 || NC State ||  || Clark–LeClair Stadium • Greenville, NC || W 6–5 || Voliva(2–0) || O'Donnell (5–3) ||  || 3,821 || 25–16 || –
|- bgcolor="#bbffbb"
| April 22 || Duke ||  || Clark–LeClair Stadium • Greenville, NC || W 3–2 || Boyd (5–7) || Koplove (1–2) ||  || 3,271 || 26–16 || –
|- bgcolor="#bbffbb"
| April 24 || UCF ||  || Clark–LeClair Stadium • Greenville, NC || W 6–5 || Durazo (3–0) || Hukari (4–3) ||  || 2,446 || 27–16 || 7–6
|- bgcolor="#bbffbb"
| April 25 || UCF ||  || Clark–LeClair Stadium • Greenville, NC || W 3–2 || Love (4–3) || Finfrock (6–4) || Ingle (1) || 2,441 || 28–16 || 8–6
|- bgcolor="#bbffbb"
| April 26 || UCF ||  || Clark–LeClair Stadium • Greenville, NC || W 6–5 || Wolfe (3–1) || Howell (4–6) || Voliva (1) || 2,069 || 29–16 || 9–6
|- bgcolor="#ffbbbb"
| April 29 || Liberty ||  || Liberty Baseball Stadium • Lynchburg, VA || L 0–5 || Pennington (1–1) || Lucroy (2–4) ||  || 791 || 29–17 || –
|-

|- bgcolor="#ffbbbb"
| May 1 || Connecticut ||  || Clark–LeClair Stadium • Greenville, NC || L 2–13 || Cross (9–2) || Kruczynski (6–3) ||  || 2,272 || 29–18 || 9–7
|- bgcolor="#bbffbb"
| May 2 || Connecticut ||  || Clark–LeClair Stadium • Greenville, NC || W 5–4 || Love (5–3) || Kay (6–5) ||  || 3,034 || 30–18 || 10–7
|- bgcolor="#bbffbb"
| May 3 || Connecticut ||  || Clark–LeClair Stadium • Greenville, NC || W 5–2 || Wolfe (4–1) || Tabakman (2–4) || Ingle (3) || 3,012 || 31–18 || 11-7
|- bgcolor="#ffbbbb"
| May 8 || at No. 28 Houston ||  || Cougar Field • Houston, TX || L 1–10 || Lantrip (7–3) || Kruczynski (6–4) ||  || 1,691 || 31–19 || 11–8
|- bgcolor="#bbffbb"
| May 9 || at No. 28 Houston ||  || Cougar Field • Houston, TX || W 4–1 || Love (6–3) || Dowdy (7–2) || Ingle (4) || 2,013 || 32–19 || 12–8
|- bgcolor="#ffbbbb"
| May 10 || at No. 28 Houston ||  || Cougar Field • Houston, TX  || L 1–11 || Romero (7–3) || Wolfe (4–2) ||  || 1,408 || 32–20 || 12–9
|- bgcolor="#bbffbb"
| May 12 || Elon ||  || Clark–LeClair Stadium • Greenville, NC || W 7–1 || Lucroy (3–4) || Jones (0–1) ||  || 2,585 || 33–20 || –
|- bgcolor="#bbffbb"
| May 14 || at Cincinnati ||  || Marge Schott Stadium • Cincinnati, OH || W 7–3 || Love (7–3) || Atkinson (4–6) ||  || 602 || 34–20 || 13–9
|- bgcolor="#bbffbb"
| May 15 || at Cincinnati ||  || Marge Schott Stadium • Cincinnati, OH || W 6–4 || Kruczynski (7–4) || Zeller (2–4) || Ingle (5) || 677 || 35–20 || 14–9
|- bgcolor="#bbffbb"
| May 16 || at Cincinnati ||  || Marge Schott Stadium • Cincinnati, OH || W 8–7 || Durazo (4–0) || Patishall (0–3) || Ingle (6) || 1,036 || 36–20 || 15–9
|-

|- 
! style="background:#4B1869;color:white;"| Post-Season
|-

|- bgcolor="#bbffbb"
| May 20 || (7) UCF || (2) || Bright House Field • Clearwater, FL || W 4–3 || Ingle (1–0) || Rodgers (10–1) ||  ||  || 37–20 || 1–0 
|- bgcolor="#bbffbb"
| May 21 || (3) Tulane || (2) || Bright House Field • Clearwater, FL|| W 3–1 || Kruczynski (8–4) || Merrill (4–6) || Ingle (7) || 1,243 || 38–20 || 2–0 
|- bgcolor="#bbffbb"
| May 23 || (6) UConn || (2) || Bright House Field • Clearwater, FL|| W 4–2 || Wofle (5–2) || Montgomerie (3–2) || Ingle (8) || 1,136 || 39–20 || 3–0
|- bgcolor="#bbffbb"
| May 24 || (1) No. 23 Houston || (2) || Bright House Field • Clearwater, FL (Championship)|| W 9–1 || Durazo (5–0) || Romero (7–4) ||  || 1,037 || 40–20 || 4–0
|-

|- bgcolor="#ffbbbb"
| May 29 || (3)  || (2) || Mark Light Field • Coral Gables, FL || L 3–6 || Thanopoulos (6–5)|| Durazo (5–1) || Cline (2) || 1,845 || 40–21 || 0–1
|- bgcolor="#ffbbbb"
| May 30 || (4)  || (2) || Mark Light Field • Coral Gables, FL || L 0–2 || Dopico (3–4) || Love (7–4) ||  || 1,929 || 40–22 || 0–2
|-

|-
| style="font-size:88%"| All rankings from Collegiate Baseball.

References

East Carolina Pirates
East Carolina Pirates baseball seasons
East Carolina